Planet Rugby is a website and forum providing news and discussion for rugby union fans of all nationalities. Published since 1999, Planet Rugby is owned and operated by Planet Sport based in Leeds.

BSkyB acquired the site along with many other sites owned by 365 Media Group for £96 million in December 2006.

BSkyB sold the sites in 2014 and Planet Rugby is now part of the Planet Sport group. It also runs a rugby forum.

The site provides news items from Premiership Rugby, Top 14 rugby, Super Rugby, United Rugby Championship, Six Nations, The Rugby Championship, Currie Cup, international rugby and other competitions from around the world.

References

Internet forums
British sport websites
Rugby football websites
Rugby union mass media
Sport Internet forums